The Damieni gas field is a natural gas field located in Eremitu, Mureș County. It was discovered in 1972 and developed by Romgaz. It began production in 1972 and produces natural gas and condensates. The total proven reserves of the Damieni gas field are around 39 billion cubic feet (1.11 km³), and production is slated to be around 4.9 million cubic feet/day (0.14×105m³) in 2010.

References

Natural gas fields in Romania